Giovanna Palma (born 11 August 1974) is an Italian politician.

Born in Naples, Palma was elected to the Italian parliament in February 2013 representing the Democratic Party.

References

External links 

Italian Parliament - Giovanna Palma

1974 births
Living people
Politicians from Naples
Democratic Party (Italy) politicians
Deputies of Legislature XVII of Italy
Politicians of Campania
21st-century Italian women politicians
Women members of the Chamber of Deputies (Italy)